Cassia aldabrensis is a species of plant in the family Fabaceae endemic to Assumption and Aldabra near the Seychelles. It is threatened by habitat destruction.

Taxonomy
Cassia mimosoides was established by Linné for a Cassieae taxon nowadays called Chamaecrista mimosoides. The taxon applied by many subsequent authors to related plants, either as a formally described junior synonym or as an informal error. John Gilbert Baker erroneously thought Linné's taxon applied to the present species, and sources that refer back to Baker can be expected to do likewise. Other "Cassia mimosoides" are:
 Cassia mimosoides sensu Brenan is erroneous for Chamaecrista pratensis
 Cassia mimosoides sensu Cordem. is erroneous for Chamaecrista nictitans ssp. patellaria
 Cassia mimosoides sensu Shimabuku is a synonym of Chamaecrista garambiensis
 Cassia mimosoides sensu Walker is a synonym of Chamaecrista nomame

Footnotes

References
  (2005): Genus Cassia. Version 10.01, November 2005. Retrieved 2007-DEC-20.

aldabrensis
Flora of Seychelles
Vulnerable plants
Endemic flora of Seychelles
Taxonomy articles created by Polbot